Åkarps IF is a Swedish football club located in Åkarp.

Background
Åkarps IF currently plays in Division 3 Södra Götaland which is the fifth tier of Swedish football. They play their home matches at the Åkarps IP in Åkarp.

The club is affiliated to Skånes Fotbollförbund.

Footnotes

External links
 Åkarps IF – Official website

Sport in Skåne County
Football clubs in Skåne County